Biraj Maharjan (born 18 September 1990) is a footballer from Nepal. He made his first appearance for the Nepal national football team in 2008.

Career
Biraj Maharjan is a Nepalese defender who, after graduating from ANFA Academy joined the Three Star Club in 2007. Despite being a defender he can shoot with both feet and has scored 11 domestic goals.

International career
Maharjan made his national team debut on 25 March 2008 in a friendly that Nepal won 1–0 against Pakistan at Pokhara, Kaski. 
On 31 August 2015, he won 50 Cap for Nepal national football team in a friendly match against India. He is the most capped player for Nepal national football team. He made his last appearance in Nepal jersey on 29 March 2021 at Dasharath Rangasala, Kathmandu in which Nepal beat Bangladesh by 2 goal in finals of Three Nations Cup.

Honours

Country
Bangabandhu Gold Cup
winner:2016
AFC Solidarity Cup
winner:2016
Three Nations Cup
winner:2021

Club
Three Star Club

Martyr's Memorial A-Division League
winner:2012-13

Manang Marshyangdi Club

Martyr's Memorial A-Division League
winner:2018-19

Machhindra F.C.
Martyr's Memorial A-Division League
winner:2019-20

References

External links
 Goal.com Profile

1990 births
Living people
People from Dhading District
Nepalese footballers
Nepal international footballers
Three Star Club players
Association football defenders
Machhindra F.C. players